Major Logue (c. 1826 – 1 February 1900) was an early settler of Western Australia. Born in Ireland, he arrived in the colony as a child, and eventually settled on a pastoral property near Geraldton. Logue served in the Legislative Council of Western Australia from 1870 to 1874.

Logue was born in Derry, Ireland, to Elizabeth (née Goodwin) and Joseph Keys Logue. He arrived in Western Australia in 1837, travelling with parents onboard Hero. In 1850, Logue overlanded stock from York to Geraldton, subsequently setting up as a pastoralist near Greenough. He named his new property Ellendale, and remained there for the rest of his life. Logue entered parliament in 1870, as one of the Legislative Council's first elected representatives. He represented the seat of Geraldton until September 1874, when he resigned. Logue made two unsuccessful attempts to re-enter parliament in the 1890s, running in the seat of Greenough at the 1894 and 1897 general elections. He died at Ellendale in February 1900, of apoplexy. He had married Lucy Ellen Shaw in 1856, with whom he had four sons and five daughters.

References

1820s births
1900 deaths
Australian pastoralists
Irish emigrants to colonial Australia
Members of the Western Australian Legislative Council
People from the Mid West (Western Australia)
Settlers of Western Australia
19th-century Australian businesspeople
19th-century Australian politicians